Aschaffenburg is an electoral constituency (German: Wahlkreis) represented in the Bundestag. It elects one member via first-past-the-post voting. Under the current constituency numbering system, it is designated as constituency 247. It is located in northwestern Bavaria, comprising the city of Aschaffenburg and the district of Landkreis Aschaffenburg.

Aschaffenburg was created for the inaugural 1949 federal election. Since 2013, it has been represented by Andrea Lindholz of the Christian Social Union (CSU).

Geography
Aschaffenburg is located in northwestern Bavaria. As of the 2021 federal election, it comprises the independent city of Aschaffenburg and the district of Landkreis Aschaffenburg.

History
Aschaffenburg was created in 1949. In the 1949 election, it was Bavaria constituency 36 in the numbering system. In the 1953 through 1961 elections, it was number 231. In the 1965 through 1998 elections, it was number 233. In the 2002 and 2005 elections, it was number 248. Since the 2009 election, it has been number 247.

Originally, the constituency comprised the independent city of Aschaffenburg and the districts of Landkreis Aschaffenburg, Miltenberg, Obernburg, and Alzenau. In the 1965 through 1972 elections, it lost the district of Alzenau. It acquired its current borders in the 1976 election.

Members
The constituency has been held continuously by the Christian Social Union (CSU) since its creation. It was first represented by Hugo Karpf from 1949 to 1957, followed by Karl-Heinz Vogt from 1957 to 1969. Paul Gerlach was representative from 1969 to 1987. Norbert Geis then served from 1987 to 2013, a total of seven consecutive terms. Andrea Lindholz was elected in 2013, and re-elected in 2017 and 2021.

Election results

2021 election

2017 election

2013 election

2009 election

References

Federal electoral districts in Bavaria
1949 establishments in West Germany
Constituencies established in 1949
Aschaffenburg
Aschaffenburg (district)